Dr. Sara C. Bisel (1932–1996) was a physical anthropologist and classical archaeologist who played a prominent role in early scientific research at Herculaneum, a Mediterranean coastal town destroyed by the 79 AD eruption of Mount Vesuvius.  Her pioneering work in the chemical and physical analysis of skeletons yielded new insights into the nutrition and health of ancient populations.  This was considered ground-breaking and helped advance the field of paleodemography.

Life and work 
Born Sara Louise Clark on May 13, 1932, in Johnstown, Pennsylvania, Dr. Bisel grew up in western Pennsylvania. She graduated from Carnegie-Mellon University in Pittsburgh with a bachelor's degree in nutrition and biochemistry. She married Harry Bisel, a Mayo Clinic medical oncologist, and lived in Rochester, Minnesota from 1963.

At the University of Minnesota, she earned a master's degree in classical area studies, with a specialization in Greek archaeology, and a Ph.D. in physical anthropology.  She was awarded a fellowship by the Smithsonian Institution in 1977 and conducted independent research funded by the Smithsonian Institution and the National Geographic Society from 1981 to 1988. She was a visiting scientist at the Mayo Clinic, and a research associate and Fellow at the Smithsonian Institution.

The author of numerous articles published in scholarly and professional journals, she taught at the University of Minnesota, the University of Maryland, and the American School of Classical Studies in Athens, Greece. She worked on various sites throughout Greece, Turkey, Israel and Italy.

Her work at Herculaneum established her international reputation as an authority on ancient health and nutrition.

Sara Bisel died on 4 February 1996

Professional societies 
 American Association of Physical Anthropologists
 Paleopathology Association
 Society for Ancient Medicine and Pharmacy
 American Association for the Advancement of Science
 Society of Woman Geographers
 National Geographic Explorer's Club

Awards 
 Outstanding Woman of Science, 1988.  National Geographic Explorer's

References 

 Rochester Post Bulletin, obit, Rochester, MN,(Tuesday, February 6, 1996.)
 National Geographic, Vol 162, No 6. "Buried Roman Town Give Up Its Dead," (December, 1982)
 National Geographic, Vol 165, No 5. "The Dead Do Tell Tales," (May, 1984)
 Discover, magazine, Vol 5, No 10. "The Bone Lady" (October, 1984)
 The Mayo Alumnus, Vol 19, No2. "An Archaeologist's Preliminary Report: Time Warp at Herculaneum, (April, 1983)
 Carnegie Mellon Magazine, Vol 4, No 2. "Bone Lady Reconstructs People at Herculaneum," Winter, 1985  
 Carnegie Mellon Notable Alumni 
 "In the Shadow of Vesuvius" National Geo Special, (February 11, 1987) 
 "30 years of National Geographic Special," (January 25, 1995)

1932 births
1996 deaths
People from Johnstown, Pennsylvania
University of Minnesota College of Liberal Arts alumni
People from Rochester, Minnesota
Carnegie Mellon University alumni
University of Minnesota faculty
University of Maryland, College Park faculty
American women archaeologists
Members of the Society of Woman Geographers
20th-century American archaeologists